Mariusz Jurasik (born 4 May 1976) is a former Polish handball player who played for the Polish national team.

Career
He received a silver medal with the Polish team at the 2007 World Men's Handball Championship. He participated at the 2008 Summer Olympics, where Poland finished fifth.

References

External links
 Profile

1976 births
Living people
People from Żagań
Sportspeople from Lubusz Voivodeship
Polish male handball players
Olympic handball players of Poland
Handball players at the 2008 Summer Olympics
Expatriate handball players
Polish expatriate sportspeople in Germany
Handball-Bundesliga players
Rhein-Neckar Löwen players
Vive Kielce players
Wisła Płock (handball) players